Mejirodai is one of the districts that comprise Bunkyo in Tokyo, Japan. Divided into three sections, It currently has a population of 6,595 as of October 1, 2007.

Geography 
The area is an old residential neighborhood and a school zone. Most notable locations are:

Residence of former Japanese Prime Minister Kakuei Tanaka (His daughter Makiko Tanaka is the current occupant)
Japan Women's University
Eisei Bunko Museum
Wakeijuku

Education
Bunkyo operates the local public elementary and middle schools.

Zoned elementary schools for parts of Meijirodai are: Ooyagi (青柳小学校) and Sekiguchidaimachi (関口台町小学校).

All of Meijirodai is zoned to Otowa Junior High School (音羽中学校).

References 

Districts of Bunkyō